The 2018 Players' Championship was held from April 10 to 15, 2018 at the Mattamy Athletic Centre in Toronto, Ontario. It was the seventh men's and sixth women's Grand Slam event of the 2017–18 World Curling Tour.

On the men's side, Calgary's Kevin Koe won his first Players' Championship as a skip (he had previously won in 2004 playing third for John Morris). On the women's side, Minnesota's Jamie Sinclair rink became the first American ever team to win a Grand Slam championship.

Qualification
The top 12 ranked men's and women's teams on the World Curling Tour's year to date ranking as of March 12 qualify:

Men's
Top men's teams as of March 12:
 Niklas Edin
 Brad Gushue
 Kevin Koe
 Mike McEwen
 Peter de Cruz
 Brad Jacobs
 Brendan Bottcher 
 Reid Carruthers
 Jason Gunnlaugson
 Bruce Mouat
 John Epping
 John Shuster
 Kim Chang-min
 Thomas Ulsrud 
 Liu Rui
 Kyle Smith

Women's
Top 12 women's teams as of March 12:
 Jennifer Jones
 Anna Hasselborg
 Chelsea Carey
 Eve Muirhead
 Rachel Homan
 Kerri Einarson
 Silvana Tirinzoni
 Kim Eun-jung
 Nina Roth
 Satsuki Fujisawa
 Jamie Sinclair
 Kelsey Rocque (Laura Crocker)

Men

Teams
The teams are listed as follows:

Round-robin standings

Round-robin results
All draw times are listed in Eastern Daylight Time (UTC-04:00).

Draw 1
Tuesday, April 10, 7:00 pm

Draw 2
Wednesday, April 11, 8:30 am

Draw 3
Wednesday, April 11, 12:00 pm

Draw 5
Wednesday, April 11, 8:00 pm

Draw 7
Thursday, April 12, 12:00 pm

Draw 9
Thursday, April 12, 8:00 pm

Draw 10
Friday, April 13, 8:00 am

Draw 12
Friday, April 13, 4:00 pm

Tiebreaker
Friday, April 13, 8:00 pm

Playoffs

Quarterfinals
Saturday, April 14, 11:30 am

Semifinals
Saturday, April 14, 7:30 pm

Final
Sunday, April 15, 12:30 pm

Women

Teams
The teams are listed as follows:

Round-robin standings

Round-robin results
All draw times are listed in Eastern Daylight Time (UTC-04:00).

Draw 1
Tuesday, April 10, 7:00 pm

Draw 2
Wednesday, April 11, 8:30 am

Draw 3
Wednesday, April 11, 12:00 pm

Draw 4
Wednesday, April 11, 4:00 pm

Draw 6
Thursday, April 12, 8:30 am

Draw 8
Thursday, April 12, 4:00 pm

Draw 11
Friday, April 13, 12:00 pm

Draw 13
Friday, April 13, 8:00 pm

*Hasselborg missed the game due to illness. The team was skipped by Sara McManus for this game.

Tiebreaker
Saturday, April 14, 8:00 am

Playoffs

Quarterfinals
Saturday, April 14, 3:30 pm

Semifinals
Saturday, April 14, 7:30 pm

Final
Sunday, April 15, 5:00 pm

Notes

References

External links
Website  

Players' Championship
Players' Championship
Players' Championship
April 2018 sports events in Canada
Curling in Toronto
Sports competitions in Toronto